The SFAN 11 was an observation aircraft built in France in the early 1940s.

It was a two-seat, high-wing monoplane designed for observation and artillery liaison.

Specifications

References

High-wing aircraft
Single-engined tractor aircraft
Aircraft first flown in 1940